Sardis Secondary, abbreviated as SSS, is a public high school in Chilliwack, British Columbia part of School District 33 Chilliwack. The current principal is Dan Heisler.

Sardis Secondary has a focus on agricultural and skilled trades education. The school is also somewhat distinctive in having an active high school football team.

History

Controversies
In 2013, 12 students were suspended for a semester for using marijuana and breaking curfew on a school trip. The punishment was appealed by some parents and received a small amount of national news coverage.

Curriculum
In 2015, the sustainable agriculture program was expanded with the purchase of the SSS Farm. Students are able to grow food for a community-supported agriculture program. Participation in the program is worth four course credits, the same amount as a standard class. The program was developed with support from the University of the Fraser Valley, a university local to Chilliwack and Abbotsford.

Awards and Accomplishments 
In 2022, the Drumline, under the supervision of Kris Werner, placed third in the BC Provincial Championships, hosted by the Canadian Drumline Association, losing only to MEI and Collingwood.

References

High schools in British Columbia
Education in Chilliwack
Educational institutions established in 1933
1933 establishments in British Columbia